The 1934–35 National Hurling League was the eighth edition of the National Hurling League, which ran from 7 October 1934 until 23 June 1935.

The nine participating teams were Clare, Cork, Dublin, Galway, Kilkenny, Laois, Limerick, Tipperary and Waterford who agreed to play an eight-game format whereby each team would play each of their eight rivals once with two points awarded for a win and one point awarded for a drawn game. The team with most points at the completion of the season would be declared National Hurling League champions.

Limerick completed their eight-game programme without defeat and were declared the champions for the second successive year while Waterford finished with the fewest points.

National Hurling League

Table

Laois given a walkover by Clare

External links
 1934-35 National Hurling League results

References

National Hurling League seasons
League
League